Petronius Probianus ( 315–331 AD) was a politician of the Roman Empire.

Life 

Probianus was a member of the Petronii Probi, a family of the senatorial aristocracy. He was the son of Pompeius Probus, consul in 310, the father of Petronius Probinus, consul in 341, and of the poet Faltonia Betitia Proba, and the grandfather of Sextus Petronius Probus, consul in 371.

Probianus was proconsul of Africa in 315–317, consul in 322, and praefectus urbi of Rome from October 8, 329, to April 12, 331.

Sources 
 Lizzi Testa, Rita, Senatori, popolo, papi: il governo di Roma al tempo dei Valentiniani, Edipuglia, 2004, p. 367.
 "Faltonia Proba", The Catholic Encyclopedia, Volume XII, 1911, New York, Robert Appleton Company.

4th-century Romans
Imperial Roman consuls
Roman governors of Africa
Urban prefects of Rome
Probianus